Claude Greder (8 February 1934 – 9 April 2005) was a French water polo player. He competed in the men's tournament at the 1960 Summer Olympics.

References

1934 births
2005 deaths
French male water polo players
Olympic water polo players of France
Water polo players at the 1960 Summer Olympics
Sportspeople from Strasbourg